Erica Mildred White (13 June 1904–1991) was a British artist, notable as a sculptor and portrait painter.

Biography
White was born in Ealing, now a part of London, to a mother from Sussex and a father who was a solicitor from Somerset. After attending St George's School in Harpenden, White studied at the Slade School of Fine Art in central London, where she won a painting prize. After the Slade, White entered the Central School of Arts and Crafts and was awarded a sculpture scholarship before studying at the Royal Academy Schools where she won silver and bronze medals and a Feodora Gleichen memorial grant. After graduating White created sculpture figures, heads and busts in stone, clay and bronze as well as painting portraits in both oils and pastels. Between 1925 and 1959 she was a regular exhibitor at the Royal Academy in London and also had works shown at the Royal Glasgow Institute of the Fine Arts, with the Society of Women Artists, the Royal West of England Academy and at commercial galleries in southern England. White was an elected Fellow of the Royal Society of British Sculptors.

For many years White lived at Hampstead in north London and then had a studio at Kingsdown in Kent before spending her later years at Bexhill-on-Sea in Sussex.

References

Further reading
 Dictionary of British Artists Working 1900–1950 by Grant M. Waters (1975), published by Eastbourne Fine Art 

1904 births
1991 deaths
20th-century British sculptors
20th-century English women artists
Alumni of the Central School of Art and Design
Alumni of the Slade School of Fine Art 
Alumni of the Royal Academy Schools
English women sculptors 
People educated at St George's School, Harpenden
People from Ealing
Sculptors from London